David Morrow may refer to:

 David Morrow (politician) (1834–1905), New Brunswick MLA
 David Morrow (sports), lacrosse player and entrepreneur
 David C. Morrow (American football) (1882–1953), American football coach
 David J. Morrow (1960-2010), editor and journalist